Garden Hill Township is located in Wayne County, Illinois. As of the 2010 census, its population was 145 and it contained 73 housing units.

Geography

Demographics

References

External links
City-data.com
Illinois State Archives

Townships in Wayne County, Illinois
Townships in Illinois